The 1994 Campionati Internazionali di San Marino was a men's tennis tournament played on outdoor clay courts at the Centro Tennis Cassa di Risparmio di Fonte dell'Ovo in the City of San Marino in San Marino and was part of the World Series of the 1994 ATP Tour. It was the sixth edition of the tournament and was held from 8 August until 14 August 1994. Second-seeded Carlos Costa, who entered the main draw on a wildcard, won the singles title.

Finals

Singles

 Carlos Costa defeated  Oliver Gross 6–1, 6–3
 It was Costa's 2nd title of the year and the 6th and last of his career.

Doubles

 Neil Broad /  Greg Van Emburgh defeated  Jordi Arrese /  Renzo Furlan 6–4, 7–6

References

External links
 ITF tournament edition details

Campionati Internazionali di San Marino
San Marino CEPU Open
1994 in Sammarinese sport